The 20th Kisei 20th iteration of the Kisei tournament, a tournament in the board game go.  It was won by Cho Chikun and held in 1996. The first match was played outside Japan, in Amsterdam, the Netherlands. Chikun won 4 games to 3 over Kobayashi Satoru in the final.

Tournament

Challenger finals

Finals

References

Kisei (Go)
1996 in go